Loren Hibbs (born May 17, 1961) is an American baseball coach and former player, who is currently interim head baseball coach for the Wichita State. He previously has served as the head baseball coach at Charlotte.

Playing career 
Hibbs played college baseball for Wichita State.  During his time as a player with the Shockers, he was on the all-tournament team at the 1982 College World Series and, in 1982, set the NCAA record for runs in a season.  After college, Hibbs played a short time in the San Francisco Giants farm system, appearing in 39 games for the Everett Giants in 1984.

Coaching career 
Hibbs served as an assistant with Wichita State from 1985–1992 before being hired by the 49ers.  At Charlotte, Hibbs won the Metro Conference tournament and an NCAA Tournament berth in 1993, the Metro regular season titles in 1994 and 1995, the Atlantic 10 regular season and conference tournament titles in 2007 and 2008, and the Atlantic 10 regular season title in 2010.  In 1998 the Niners won a school-record 43 games and reached the NCAA Tournament.  Charlotte broke the 1998 mark for wins in 2007 with 49 wins, including two wins over NC State in the 2007 NCAA Tournament.

On June 14, 2019, Hibbs announced his retirement as head coach of Charlotte baseball.

Head coaching record
Below is a table of Hibbs's yearly records as an NCAA head baseball coach.

Personal 
Hibbs's wife, Lisa, is the director of the Athletic Academic Center at UNC Charlotte.  His son Tyson Hibbs played for his father as a utility player and pinch runner with the 49ers from 2006 to 2009.  He is also the father of two daughters, Erin and Lanie.

References 

1961 births
Living people
Baseball coaches from Kansas
Baseball players from Kansas
Charlotte 49ers baseball coaches
Everett Giants players
Wichita State Shockers baseball coaches
Wichita State Shockers baseball players
People from Wellington, Kansas